Lithium aspartate (C4H6LiNO4) is a salt of aspartic acid and lithium. It is sometimes marketed as a dietary supplement used in small doses to treat certain medical conditions; however, there are no systematic reviews supporting the efficacy, or safety, of lithium aspartate and it is not approved by the U.S. Food and Drug Administration (FDA) for the treatment of any medical condition. Published research on lithium aspartate is sparse.

Aspartatic acid stimulates the NMDA receptor.

See also
 Aspartic acid
 Lithium (medication)

References

External links
Lithium – The Misunderstood Mineral Part 1 article on lithium compounds by Jonathan Wright, M.D.

Lithium salts
Organolithium compounds